The Pilatus SB-2 Pelican was a civil utility aircraft developed by the newly formed Pilatus Aircraft company and the ETH Zurich during World War II.

Design and development
Work on the SB-2 Pelican, a special “slow-flying” aircraft, commenced in the winter of 1941. Good short takeoff and landing credentials, plus steep climbing capabilities, were essential attributes of the aircraft flown in the narrow Alpine valleys at that time. The aircraft was designed to carry four to six passengers.

The configuration of the SB-2 was slightly unusual, in that it was provided with tricycle undercarriage (an uncommon feature at the time), and a wing that had a slight forward sweep.

The Pilatus SB-2 also served as the basis for a slightly larger STOL aircraft with a larger cargo and passenger capacity, the Pilatus SB-5. However, the Pilatus SB-5 was never built.

Operational history
The SB-2 made its maiden flight on 30 May 1944. After extensive trials, the only model built went to Alpar AG in Bern. The Pelikan was particularly well suited for passenger operations, but could also be used for aerial photography, survey flights, freight transport and agricultural work.

During an air display on 13 June 1948, the Pelican flipped over because the nosewheel sheared off from an unnoticed transverse fracture.  It was damaged beyond repair.

Specifications (SB-2)

See also

Further reading
Pilatus SB-2 Pelican Das Schweizer Bergflugzeug 1938–1949, Studienbüro für Spezialflugzeuge, Kuno Gross, .

References

1940s Swiss civil utility aircraft
High-wing aircraft
Single-engined tractor aircraft
SB-2
Forward-swept-wing aircraft
Aircraft first flown in 1944